Aachener Domchor (Aachen Cathedral choir) is the oldest boys' choir in Germany and one of the oldest in the world. It is based at the Aachen Cathedral in Aachen, a former capital of the Carolingian Empire. The year 782 is given for its founding by Charlemagne and Alcuin of York. Under a succession of directors, the choir gained an international reputation, benefiting from an associated school. Since 2000, the Domchor has been directed by Berthold Botzet.

History 
The Aachener Domchor is the oldest boys' choir in Germany and one of the oldest in the world. It is based at the Aachen Cathedral in Aachen, a former capital of the Carolingian Empire. The choir is sometimes also identified using its Latin name, Cappella Carolina. The choir dates back more than 1200 years, with the year 782 given for its founding. It served church music at the cathedral for the court of Charlemagne. The choir school (schola cantorum) was founded by the emperor and Alcuin of York, and was known then as the Schola Palatina, the "Palatinate Choir".

Botzet is assisted by the cathedral cantor, who is also in charge of the girls' choir at Aachen Cathedral: Marco Fühner was appointed to this post in July 2013.

The choir tours internationally, and has collaborated with other boys' choirs and youth choirs in Europe. It was awarded the Kaiser Karl IV Medal, an Aachen cultural prize, in 2013, together with the youth choir Svonky from Prague.

Kapellmeister 
Leading directors of the music in stift and cathedral (kapellmeister) have included:
 16th century: Johannes Mangon (1525–1578) (cantor and Stiftskapellmeister)
 1745–1772 Anton Joseph Lacand
 1835–1840 Anton Felix Schindler (municipal music director
 1864–1891  (from 1881 director of the Gregoriushaus)
 1891–1913 
 1913–1918 
 1918–1924 Leo Wachten
 1924–1963  (1945–1946 interim municipal Generalmusikdirektor (GMD))
 1964–1986 Rudolf Pohl
 1986–2000 
 from 2000 Berthold Botzet

References

Further reading 
 Rudolf Pohl: Musik im Dom zu Aachen. 1200 Jahre Chorschule am Hofe Karls des Großen. Aachen 1981, pp. 3–18.
 August Brecher: Musik im Aachener Dom in zwölf Jahrhunderten. Einhard, Aachen 1998, ISBN 3-930701-57-X (260 p., illustrated).

External links 
  

German choirs
Choirs of children
Boys' and men's choirs
Musical groups established in the 9th century
Aachen Cathedral
German church music
Church choirs